Lito Legaspi (born Ludovico A. Legaspi, September 10, 1941 – September 8, 2019) was a Filipino actor both in movies and television in the Philippines. He was the father of actors Zoren Legaspi, Kier Legaspi, and Brando Legaspi. He won Gawad Urian Award for Best Supporting Actor in Sinong Kapiling? Sinong Kasiping? (1977).

Early career
Legaspi appeared in 1959 comedy film Ipinagbili Kami Ng Aming Tatay, starring Dolphy. In 1963, Sampaguita Pictures introduced Legaspi together with teenage stars such as Rosemarie Sonora, Gina Pareño, Dindo Fernando, Pepito Rodriguez, Romeo Rivera and Bert Leroy, Jr., among others. He became a matinee idol like Eddie Gutierrez, Jose Mari Gonzales, Romeo Vasquez, Greg Martin and Juancho Gutierrez. He played an impotent husband in the movie Uhaw (1970) with Merle Fernandez and Tito Galla, directed by Ruben Abalos.

Later career
He played Mayor Joaquin Montejo in Esperanza shown in ABS-CBN, starring Judy Ann Santos in 1997. He also played as Governor in Makapiling Kang Muli, GMA Network's prime time television series.

As a veteran actor, he appeared in more than 120 movies and television shows since 1959.

He was inducted to the Eastwood City Walk Of Fame Philippines in December 2014 for his contribution in movie acting and also TV acting.

Personal life
Lito had 3 children, Zoren, Kier and Brando who are also prospective movie actors. His daughter-in-law (Zoren's wife), Carmina Villaroel-Legaspi is an actress and TV presenter. His grandchildren, fraternal twins Maverick and Cassandra (children of Zoren and Carmina) and Dani Barretto (daughter of Kier and actress Marjorie Barretto) are in show business as well.

Health and death
On September 6, 2019, Legaspi was rushed to the Cardinal Santos Memorial Medical Center after having chest pains. He later died from cardiac arrest and was pronounced dead at around 10:00 AM on September 8, 2019, two days before his 78th birthday.
He was buried at Caryana Monastery in  Magalang, Pampanga.

Selected filmography

Film

Television

References

External links

1941 births
2019 deaths
Filipino male television actors
People from San Juan, Metro Manila